Libertad is La Ley's seventh studio album. It was inspired primarily by the September 11 attacks.  The album contains the hits  "Ámate y Sálvate", "Más allá" and "Mi Ley". This is the band’s second studio album as a trio.

Album theme 

The album's main theme is based on the September 11 attacks and its subsequent effects. Beto Cuevas also used different societal factors as themes for the songs.  Most of the songs are about the search for liberty (expressing it the songs "Libertad" and "Ámate y Sálvate") while others talk about the world in which we are living today ("Y Los Demás"). Other songs deal with the corruption of politicians ("¿Sabes Quien Eres?") and a little about the world today ("Esa Es La Verdad" and "Mi Ley.")

Aside from the more political topics, some of the songs have more relatable themes, such as never giving up on goals ("Durar Hasta el Final"). The album also tells various stories with topics such as suicide ("Más Allá"), long-distance relationships ("Surazul") and the story of a girl that searches for revenge on her cheaters ("Hotel Malibú"). The album also talks about the preoccupation with the Twin Towers attack, directly on ("En Casa"). The album closes with a song expressing the desire for a perfect world ("Mundo Ideal").

Commercial performance

In Chile and Argentina, the album sold well, eventually earning Gold status in the latter, however, sales in all markets were generally low in comparison to their previous three studio albums. 

Despite low sales in the United States, Libertad still managed to win the 2004 Latin Grammy Award for Best Rock Performance by a Group or Duo.

Aftermath

This would be the last studio album by the band before their breakup in 2005, however, new material would still be released after this album, as the compilation Historias e Histeria would include the songs “Mirate”, “Histeria”, and “Bienvenido al Anochecer”, all of which were released as singles.

The band would not release any new material until 2016, with the release of Adaptación.

Track listing

Sales and certifications

Personnel

La Ley 
Mauricio Clavería - Drums
Beto Cuevas - Vocalist
Pedro Frugone - Lead Guitar

Guests 
Archie Frugone - Bass
Andres Sylleros- keyboard

References

External links 
 Official Site

2003 albums
La Ley (band) albums
Latin Grammy Award for Best Rock Album by a Duo or Group with Vocal